Huangzhou or Huang Prefecture was a zhou (prefecture) in imperial China, centering on modern Huangzhou District, Huanggang, Hubei, China. It existed (intermittently) from 585 until 1279.

The modern district, created in 1996 (although it also existed between 1984 and 1987 under the administration of Ezhou), retains its name.

Geography
The administrative region of Huang Prefecture in the Tang dynasty was in modern eastern Hubei. It probably includes parts of modern: 
Under the administration of Huanggang:
Huangzhou District
Under the administration of Wuhan:
Xinzhou District

See also
Yong'an Commandery
Huangzhou Route
Huangzhou Prefecture

References
 

Prefectures of the Sui dynasty
Prefectures of the Tang dynasty
Prefectures of Yang Wu
Prefectures of Southern Tang
Prefectures of Later Zhou
Prefectures of the Song dynasty
Former prefectures in Hubei